Chernavka is a rural locality (a selo) and the administrative center of Chernavskoye Rural Settlement, Paninsky District, Voronezh Oblast, Russia. The population was 616 as of 2010. There are 6 streets.

Geography 
Chernavka is located 22 km northeast of Panino (the district's administrative centre) by road. Borshchyovo is the nearest rural locality.

References 

Rural localities in Paninsky District